Youngstown, Ohio is a city in the US state of Ohio and the county seat of Mahoning County.

Youngstown may also refer to:
Youngstown (band), an American boy band
"Youngstown" (song), 1995, by Bruce Springsteen
Youngstown, Alberta
Youngstown, California
Youngstown, Florida
Youngstown, Indiana
Youngstown, Missouri
Youngstown, New York
Youngstown, Pennsylvania
Youngstown State University, in Ohio
Youngstown Sheet & Tube Co. v. Sawyer, a 1952 United States Supreme Court case delineating the federal executive power

See also
Britannia Youngstown, Edmonton, Alberta